The 10th Los Angeles Film Critics Association Awards were announced on 5 December 1984 and given on 24 January 1985.

Winners
Best Picture:
Amadeus
Runner-up: Once Upon a Time in America
Best Director:
Miloš Forman - Amadeus
Runner-up: Sergio Leone – Once Upon a Time in America
Best Actor (tie):
F. Murray Abraham – Amadeus
Albert Finney – Under the Volcano
Best Actress:
Kathleen Turner - Crimes of Passion and Romancing the Stone
Runner-up: Vanessa Redgrave – The Bostonians
Best Supporting Actor:
Adolph Caesar - A Soldier's Story
Runner-up: John Malkovich – Places in the Heart and The Killing Fields
Best Supporting Actress:
Peggy Ashcroft – A Passage to India
Runner-up: Christine Lahti – Swing Shift
Best Screenplay:
Peter Shaffer - Amadeus
Runner-up: Alan Rudolph – Choose Me
Best Cinematography:
Chris Menges – The Killing Fields
Runner-up: Robby Müller – Repo Man and Paris, Texas
Best Music Score:
Ennio Morricone – Once Upon a Time in America
Runner-up: Amadeus
Best Foreign Film:
The Fourth Man (De vierde man) • Netherlands
Runner-up: The Gods Must Be Crazy • Botswana/South Africa
Experimental/Independent Film/Video Award:
George Kuchar (for the body of his work)
New Generation Award:
Alan Rudolph
Career Achievement Award:
Rouben Mamoulian
Special Citation:
Andrew Sarris
François Truffaut

References

External links
10th Annual Los Angeles Film Critics Association Awards

1984
Los Angeles Film Critics Association Awards
Los Angeles Film Critics Association Awards
Los Angeles Film Critics Association Awards
Los Angeles Film Critics Association Awards